Edgar Jones may refer to:

Edgar Jones (actor), American actor
Edgar Dewitt Jones (1876–1956), American clergyman and author 
Edgar Jones (politician) (1878–1962), British Member of Parliament for Merthyr Tydfil, 1910–1918, and Merthyr, 1918–1922
Edgar C. Jones (1903–1980), American football player, college athletic director
Edgar Jones (Australian footballer) (1907–1970), Australian rules footballer
Edgar Jones (rugby) (1910–1986), rugby union and rugby league footballer of the 1930s for Wales (RU), Llanelli, and Leeds (RL)
Edgar Jones (running back) (1920–2004), former running back for the Cleveland Browns
Edgar Jones (basketball) (born 1956), retired American basketball player 
Edgar Jones (musician) (born 1970), English musician, formerly of the Stairs
Edgar Jones (linebacker) (born 1984), linebacker/Defensive end for the Dallas Cowboys

See also
Edward Jones (disambiguation)
Jones (disambiguation)